Wanda de Boncza (8 March 1872 – 15 August 1902) was a French actress, born Wanda-Marie-Émilie Rutkowska.

Early life
Wanda-Marie-Émilie Rutkowska was born in Paris, the daughter of  Polish-Jewish immigrants.  She studied comedy at the Conservatoire de Paris with Gustave Worms.

Career
Wanda de Boncza was considered a stage beauty in Paris, acting first at the Odéon, and then at the Comédie-Française. One English-language critic in 1901 described her stage presence as "little and dark, Parisian and perverse, she whose eyes are enigmas ... beautiful in her own odd way." Her stage appearances included roles in Fiancée (1894), La Barynia (1894), On ne badine pas avec l'amour (1896), Struensée (1898), La Conscience de l'enfant (1899), Alkestis (1900), and Le Marquis de Priola (1902).

Personal life
Wanda de Boncza died in Paris in 1902, aged 30 years, from appendicitis and an attempted surgical intervention. Some reports also mentioned that morphine addiction may have contributed to her early death. A few months after her death, there was an auction of her jewelry (especially pearls), gowns, and other possessions, yielding over a million francs, more than enough to pay off her gambling and other debts.

References

External links
 A cigarette card featuring Wanda de Boncza, from the New York Public Library Digital Collections.
 A photograph of Wanda de Boncza in the collection of the Musée d'Orsay, Paris.

1872 births
1902 deaths
French actresses
Actresses from Paris
French people of Polish-Jewish descent